A cove is a tightly concentrated group of large standing stones found in Neolithic and Bronze Age England. Coves are square or rectangular in plan and seem to have served as small enclosures within other henge, stone circle or avenue features. They consist of three or four orthostats placed together to give the impression of a box. An opening between the stones, oriented south east, is also a feature.

They may have developed from the elaborate facades that fronted Neolithic long barrows, although their original function is unknown.

Examples include:

The Longstones in Wiltshire;
The cove at Avebury Henge in Wiltshire;
The cove at Stanton Drew in Somerset and
The cove at Mount Pleasant henge in Dorset

See also 
Dolmen
Megalithic architectural elements
Menhir

References

External links
Coves, structural enigmas of the Neolithic – Wiltshire excavation report, 2000, Southampton University; archived June 2004

Types of monuments and memorials